George Armitstead (27 October 1847 – 17 November 1912) was an engineer, entrepreneur and the fourth Mayor of Riga.

Life
George Armitstead was born in Riga, Latvia (then: Russian Empire) into a British merchant family; his uncle was George Armitstead, 1st Baron Armitstead.
 
In 1869, Armitstead graduated from the Riga Polytechnical Institute with excellence, and was one of the founders of the Fraternitas Baltica fraternity. He improved his knowledge at Zurich and Oxford universities. Later on, Armitstead worked as an engineer in Russia. After working in Russia, he came back to Riga, where his family owned many properties and factories, and became a significant social figure of the city life.

On 7 May 1901 the Riga City Council elected Armitstead to be the Mayor of Riga. He transformed Riga rapidly: he built many of today's buildings in Riga, 13 schools, 3 hospitals, the National Museum, the Zoo, libraries and cafés. Industry and commerce developed significantly. During the period when he was mayor, Riga turned from a small city into a major European city.

Emperor Nicholas II of Russia appreciated Armitstead's work and titled him a Laird of the Russian Empire, while offering him to become the Mayor of St Petersburg, but Armitstead refused.

Death

In 1912 Armitstead fell ill. On 29 October Riga City Council awarded him Honorary Citizenship. George Armitstead died on 17 November 1912. Today, Armitstead is remembered as one of the most honorable people of Riga.

In 2006, during her first visit to Latvia, Queen Elizabeth II  unveiled a memorial statue of George Armitstead, with his wife Cecile and dog. The monument is in the gardens close to the Latvian National Opera. There is also a plaque in his memory on his house at 19 Mārstaļu Street, Riga and a bust on Strēlnieku ielā.

References

Sources
 GHistopry
 arcyive

Mayors of Riga
1847 births
1912 deaths
Riga Technical University alumni
Russian nobility
19th-century Latvian politicians
20th-century Latvian politicians
19th-century engineers
20th-century engineers
19th-century businesspeople from the Russian Empire
20th-century Latvian businesspeople
Latvian expatriates in Russia